Vladimir Terentyevich Pashuto (19 April 1918 – 10 June 1983) was a Russian Marxist historian who specialized in the history of medieval Lithuania and Russia, especially in their foreign policies.

He graduated from the Leningrad University in 1941 and joined the staff of the Institute of History of the Soviet Academy of Sciences in 1948. He was elected a corresponding member of the Academy of Sciences in 1976. He was awarded the Order of the Badge of Honor.

In his 1958 monograph The Genesis of Lithuania he argued that it was the pressure of Teutonic invasions that forced the disparate Lithuanian tribes to forge a unified state known as the Grand Duchy of Lithuania. Pashuto is credited as consultant on several films about medieval Russia, including Tarkovsky's masterpiece Andrei Rublev (1966).

Pashuto and his colleague Anatoly Novoseltsev helped bring to light a number of foreign sources related to Russia's medieval history. His approach was further developed by a team of prominent disciples such as Alexander Nazarenko.

References

External links 
 A collection of articles in memory of Vladimir T. Pashuto

1918 births
1983 deaths
Russian medievalists
Saint Petersburg State University alumni
Historians of Lithuania
Corresponding Members of the USSR Academy of Sciences
Soviet historians